The 1961–62 season was the 47th in the history of the Isthmian League, an English football competition.

Wimbledon were champions, winning their sixth Isthmian League title.

League table

References

Isthmian League seasons
I